UMB Grup is a privately held company of Romania, mainly active in the construction business (through it subsidiaries "Spedition UMB" and "Tehnostrade") and in the transport and sale of petrol. The company is owned by the Romanian entrepreneur Dorinel Umbrărescu, who also owns Banca Română de Credite și Investiții (formerly ATEbank Romania), and who is commonly known as Romania's "asphalt king".

Projects
The "Spedition UMB" subsidiary was involved in Romania in the construction of segments of roads, including but not limited to:
 The A3 motorway (between Moara Vlăsiei – Ploiești, 43.0 km, and Gilău – Nădășelu – Mihăiești – Zimbor – Poarta Sălajului, entirely 51.8 km)
 The A1 motorway (the lot 1 of the Lugoj – Timișoara motorway, between Giarmata – Izvin, 9.5 km, widely acclaimed at the time for being opened to traffic ahead of the deadline; and the lot 4 of the Deva – Lugoj motorway, between Ilia and Șoimuș, 22.1 km)
 The A7 motorway (the Bacău bypass, 30.6 km, of which 16.2 km of motorway)
 The DX12 expressway (segments Balș – Slatina (39.8 km), Slatina – Colonești (31.7 km), Colonești – Pitești (31.8 km); most of the total length of 121 km of the DX12).

References

External links

Construction and civil engineering companies of Romania
Oil and gas companies of Romania
Companies based in Bacău